Dan Money (born 17 October 1976 in Glossop, Derbyshire, England) is a British bobsledder who has competed since 2006. At the 2010 Winter Olympics in Vancouver, he finished 17th in the four-man event while crashing out in the two-man event whilst in 8th place.

Money's best finish at the FIBT World Championships was fifth in the four-man event at St. Moritz in 2007 with Lee Johnston and Allyn Condon. His best World Cup finish was 12th in the four-man event at Whistler, British Columbia in 2009 also with Johnston and Condon. His highest two-man finish was 13th in Winterberg also in the 2009 season.

In the 2010/2011 season his best World Cup finish was 14th in the two-man event in St. Moritz. The previous week, Money and driver John James Jackson won the Europa Cup two-man event at St Moritz.

Money is a former Track & Field athlete whose notable achievements include a 100m personal best of 10.16 seconds and World University Games bronze medal in the 100m at the athletics at the 1997 Summer Universiade. He also won a European Junior Gold medal at 1995 European Athletics Junior Championships in the same 4 × 100 m team as Dwain Chambers and Marlon Devonish and a Bronze medal in the 200m.

Athletics statistics

Personal bests

References
 

1976 births
Bobsledders at the 2010 Winter Olympics
British male bobsledders
English male bobsledders
Living people
Olympic bobsledders of Great Britain
Sportspeople from Sheffield
English male sprinters
British male sprinters
Universiade medalists in athletics (track and field)
Universiade bronze medalists for Great Britain
Medalists at the 1997 Summer Universiade